The Quadrilateral group or the Quad is an informal group which includes the trade spokespersons of Canada, the European Union, Japan, and the United States. It was first suggested at a private meeting during the 7th G7 summit in July 1981. Initially, a trilateral group was proposed (excluding Canada) because of the tensions between the two North American countries at that time but eventually, the Canadian Government successfully lobbied to be included. The European Commission has avoided formalizing the group because of resistance from the European Union members, particularly France, who resent their lack of direct involvement.

List of Quadrilateral meetings

See also
European Commissioner for Trade
Group of Seven
Minister of Economy, Trade and Industry (Japan)
Minister of International Trade Diversification (Canada)
Office of the United States Trade Representative
Organisation for Economic Co-operation and Development (OECD)

References

International trade organizations
Trade ministers